HMS Janus was a 44-gun Roebuck-class fifth rate of the Royal Navy.

History
From May 1780 she was under the command of Captain Horatio Nelson, though he was superseded by September that year.

In 1788 Janus was converted to a storeship and renamed Dromeday.

In 1793 Dromedary was under the command of Captain Sandford Tatham

Dromedary was at Plymouth on 20 January 1795 and so shared in the proceeds of the detention of the Dutch naval vessels, East Indiamen, and other merchant vessels that were in port on the outbreak of war between Britain and the Netherlands.

Loss
HMS Dromedary was wrecked on the Parasol Rocks, Trinidad on 10 August 1800. Her entire complement survived.

References

1778 ships
Storeships of the Royal Navy
Ships built in Limehouse
Fifth-rate frigates of the Royal Navy
Maritime incidents in 1800
Shipwrecks in the Caribbean Sea
Horatio Nelson